Federal Route 162, or Jalan Durian Perangin, is a major federal road in Langkawi Island, Kedah, Malaysia.

Features

At most sections, the Federal Route 162 was built under the JKR R5 road standard, with a speed limit of 90 km/h.

List of junctions and towns

References

Malaysian Federal Roads
Roads in Langkawi